The United Freedom Forces (or BÖG) is a joint expatriate militia of several revolutionary socialist organizations from Turkey, most notably the  Revolutionary Communard Party (DKP), active in the Rojava conflict of the Syrian Civil War.

Inspired by the International Brigades of the Spanish Civil War, the militia was founded in December 2014 in Kobanê within the de facto autonomous region of Rojava in Syria.

The predominant Hoxhaist Marxist–Leninist Communist Party and the Maoist TİKKO did not join the United Freedom Forces, but together with other communist groups from Turkey, Spain and Greece, in June 2015, they altogether formed the International Freedom Battalion.

Member groups

Revolutionary Communard Party
The Revolutionary Communard Party (abbreviated as DKP) is a revolutionary socialist group from Turkey. It was founded in February 2016 as a merger of the Proletarian Revolutionary Liberation Organisation (abbreviated as PDKÖ) and the Revolution Party of Turkey (abbreviated as TDP). Devrimci Karargâh joined in 2017. The party is the most notable group behind BÖG and also part of the Peoples' United Revolutionary Movement alliance in Turkey with the PKK and nine other groups.

MLSPB-DC
The Marxist–Leninist Armed Propaganda Corps-Revolutionary Front (abbreviated as MLSPB-DC) is a communist armed group from Turkey. A battalion was created by Devrimci Karargâh and MLSPB-DC named after Alper Çakas, an MLSPB-DC fighter killed while fighting in Rojava. It is also part of the Peoples' United Revolutionary Movement.

Sosyal İsyan
Social Insurrection (abbreviated as Sİ) is a green anarchist and platformist group from Turkey. Sİ was founded in 2013, in the Tuzluçayır district of Ankara. Members of the group cite the influence of Alfredo M. Bonanno, Nestor Makhno, and Pierre-Joseph Proudhon.

Units

Women's Freedom Forces (Kadın Özgürlük Gücü)
Devrimci Cephe
Devrimci Karargâh
Aziz Güler Özgürlük Gücü Milis Örgütü
Kader Ortakaya Timi
Kızılbaş Timi
Mahir Arpaçay Devrimci Savaş Okulu
Necdet Adalı Müfrezesi
Spartaküs Timi
Şehit Bedreddin Taburu
Kader Ortakaya Timi
Emek ve Özgürlük Cephesi

Controversy with Turkey 
On 21 September 2015, BÖG commander Aziz Güler (nom de guerre: Rasih Kurtuluş) was killed by a landmine explosion whilst fighting against ISIL. His body was taken to a hospital in Serê Kaniyê (Ras al-Ayn) to be brought back to Turkey. Turkish authorities refused to allow his body into the country, sparking controversy. His family had appealed to the Suruç district governorate, which rejected their application due to an invisible order by the Council of Ministers, and the Constitutional Court of Turkey, which also rejected their requests, before turning to the European Court of Human Rights. After 59 days, Güler's body was able to enter Turkey and was buried in Istanbul on 22 November 2015.

See also
People's Protection Units
List of armed groups in the Syrian Civil War

External links

References

Bibliography 
 

2014 establishments in Syria
Anarchist militant groups
Anarchist organizations in Turkey
Anti-ISIL factions in Syria
Communist militant groups
Communist organizations in Turkey
Expatriate units and formations in the Syrian civil war
Far-left politics in Turkey
Guerrilla organizations
International Freedom Battalion
Kurdish organisations
Left-wing militant groups in Turkey
Military units and formations established in 2014
Political party alliances in Turkey